Dorcadion laevepunctatum is a species of beetle in the family Cerambycidae. It was described by Breuning in 1944.

See also 
Dorcadion

References

laevepunctatum
Beetles described in 1944